Mr. Peabody & Sherman is a 2014 American computer-animated science fiction comedy produced by DreamWorks Animation, Pacific Data Images, and Bullwinkle Studios and distributed by 20th Century Fox. The film is based on characters from the Peabody's Improbable History segments of the animated television series The Adventures of Rocky and Bullwinkle and Friends, and was directed by Rob Minkoff from a screenplay by Craig Wright, with Alex Schwartz and Denise Nolan Cascino serving as producers and Tiffany Ward, daughter of series co-creator Jay Ward, serving as executive producer. Mr. Peabody & Sherman features the voices of Ty Burrell, Max Charles, Ariel Winter, Stephen Colbert, Leslie Mann, and Allison Janney. In the film, Mr. Peabody (Burrell) and Sherman (Charles) use the WABAC to embark on time travel adventures. When Sherman accidentally rips a hole by taking the WABAC without permission to impress Penny Peterson (Winter), they must find themselves to repair history and save the future.

It is the first DreamWorks animated feature to feature characters from the Classic Media library since its acquisition by DreamWorks Animation in 2012, the first animated adaptation of a Jay Ward property, and Minkoff's first animated film after having co-directed The Lion King for Walt Disney Animation Studios in 1994.

Mr. Peabody & Sherman premiered on February 7, 2014 in the United Kingdom, and was released theatrically a month later in the United States. It received generally positive reviews from critics, who praised the humor, animation, soundtrack, voice acting, and action sequences. Despite grossing over $275 million worldwide against a budget of $145 million, the film became a box office flop and lost the studio $57 million. A TV series based on the film, titled The Mr. Peabody & Sherman Show, premiered on Netflix on October 9, 2015, with Chris Parnell replacing Burrell as Mr. Peabody while Charles reprises his role as Sherman.

Plot
Mr. Peabody is a highly intelligent anthropomorphic dog who lives in a New York City penthouse with his adopted human son, Sherman. Peabody teaches Sherman history by using the WABAC to travel to the past. After narrowly escaping the French Revolution, and on his first day of school, Sherman's knowledge of the apocryphal nature of the George Washington cherry tree anecdote leads to an altercation with one of his classmates Penny Peterson who calls him a dog and puts him in a chokehold. After Sherman bites Penny in self-defense, Peabody is called into the office of Principal Purdy. Also in attendance is Ms. Grunion, a child protective services agent who suspects Peabody of being an unfit parent and plans to visit their home to investigate.

Peabody invites the Petersons over for a dinner party to make amends before Grunion arrives. Against Peabody's orders, Sherman shows Penny the WABAC and takes her into the past, where she stays in Ancient Egypt to marry King Tut. Sherman returns to the present to get Peabody's help. Penny initially refuses to leave until she is informed that she as well will be killed alongside Tut during the wedding and escapes with Peabody and Sherman.

While trying to return to the present, the WABAC runs out of power, forcing the trio to stop at the home of Leonardo da Vinci in Renaissance Florence. Penny goads Sherman into piloting da Vinci’s flying machine which he manages to do before they crash. After they resume their journey, Sherman learns of Ms. Grunion's plot and argues with Peabody. After they crash-land in the middle of the Trojan War, Sherman runs away and joins King Agamemnon’s army. During the battle, Penny and Sherman are trapped inside the Trojan Horse as it rolls towards a ravine. Peabody saves them, but seemingly dies in doing so. 

Sherman and Penny travel back to a few minutes before they left in the present to find Peabody, despite his earlier warnings to never return to a time in which they existed. As Sherman and Penny try to explain the situation, Sherman's earlier self shows up. When Grunion arrives, Peabody tries to conceal the presence of two Shermans, but the second Peabody, having survived the crash, arrives back from Troy. Grunion attempts to collect both Shermans, but they and the Peabodys merge, generating a massive cosmic shockwave. When Grunion again tries to take Sherman away, Peabody bites her in a fit of rage, and she calls the New York Police Department.

Peabody, Penny, and Sherman race to the WABAC, but cannot time-travel due to a rip in the space-time continuum caused by the merging of their cosmic doubles. A portal appears above New York and historical objects and figures rain down upon the city. The WABAC crash-lands in Grand Army Plaza where historical figures and police converge. Grunion calls in animal control to arrest Peabody, but Sherman and all others come to Peabody’s defense with George Washington pardoning him. As the rip worsens, Peabody and Sherman take off in the WABAC and travel into the future for a few minutes, successfully undoing the damage. The historical figures are dragged back to their respective eras and Agamemnon takes Grunion with him.

Sherman returns to school, having become friends with Penny and deepened his bond with Peabody. Meanwhile, Agamemnon marries Grunion while history has been become contaminated with modern traits.

Voice cast

 Ty Burrell as Hector J. Peabody, a talking intelligent white beagle, business titan, inventor, scientist, Nobel laureate, gourmet chef, and two-time Olympic medalist.
 Max Charles as Sherman, Peabody's seven-year-old adopted son.
 Ariel Winter as Penny Peterson, Mr. and Mrs. Peterson's daughter and Sherman's classmate.
 Stephen Colbert as Paul Peterson, Penny Peterson's father and Patty's husband.
 Leslie Mann as Patty Peterson, Paul's wife and Penny's mother.
 Allison Janney as Edwina Grunion, the bigoted and stocky Children's Services agent.
 Stephen Tobolowsky as Principal Purdy, the principal of Sherman's school.
 Stanley Tucci as Leonardo da Vinci
 Adam Alexi-Malle as a French peasant
 Patrick Warburton as King Agamemnon
 Zach Callison as King Tut
 Steve Valentine as Ay, an Egyptian who conspires to kill King Tut and Penny.
 Dennis Haysbert as a judge who grants Mr. Peabody the custody of Sherman.
 Leila Birch as the WABAC
 Karan Brar as Mason, one of Sherman's friends.
 Joshua Rush as Carl, another one of Sherman's friends who also wears glasses and is seen in a wheelchair.
 Thomas Lennon as Italian Peasant #2

In addition to Leonardo da Vinci, King Agamemnon, and King Tut, the film features other historical figures including Albert Einstein (Mel Brooks), Mona Lisa (Lake Bell), Marie Antoinette (Lauri Fraser), Maximilien Robespierre (Guillaume Aretos), George Washington, Abraham Lincoln, Bill Clinton, Isaac Newton (all voiced by Jess Harnell), Odysseus (Tom McGrath), Ajax the Lesser (Al Rodrigo) and Spartacus (Walt Dohrn).

There are also silent cameos by Benjamin Franklin, Mahatma Gandhi, William Shakespeare, Ludwig van Beethoven, Vincent van Gogh, the Wright Brothers, Jackie Robinson and baby Moses.

Production

Development

Plans for a film starring Mister Peabody and Sherman had existed for several years with director Rob Minkoff. His first attempt to make a feature film goes to 2003, when it was reported that Minkoff's Sony-based production company Sprocketdyne Entertainment and Bullwinkle Studios would produce a live-action/CG film, with a possibility of Minkoff to direct it.

The live-action film was not realized, but in 2006, Minkoff joined DreamWorks Animation to direct a computer-animated film adaptation. Andrew Kurtzman was set to write the screenplay, based on the pitch, developed by Minkoff with his longtime producing partner Jason Clark. The final screenplay was written by Craig Wright, with revisions by Robert Ben Garant and Thomas Lennon.

Tiffany Ward, daughter of Jay Ward, one of the creators of the original series, served as an executive producer, whose job was to make sure the film stayed "true to the integrity of the characters." When she was approached by Minkoff ten years before the film's release, she was enthused by his intention to respect the legacy: "What better caretaker for the characters could we ask for than Rob." The process to make the adaptation "perfect" took them a long time, but she was pleased with the end result, which stayed "very true to the original cartoon."

Casting
In early 2011, Robert Downey Jr. signed on to voice Mr. Peabody, but in March 2012, he was replaced by Ty Burrell. Reportedly, Downey's commitments to The Avengers and other franchises did not allow him to find the time to record his lines. Initially, Tiffany Ward and others at the studio opposed Burrell, who was then relatively unknown, but he managed to convince them with a successful audition. Ward insisted on someone who sounds like Mr. Peabody did in the original series, while Minkoff saw the casting as an opportunity "to modernize the character." He promised her that Burrell would try to "get there and he started watching the show to nail the cadence. He got the underlying connection and he made it his own."

Max Charles, the actor who played young Peter Parker in The Amazing Spider-Man, voiced Sherman. Stephen Colbert voiced Paul Peterson, Leslie Mann, who replaced Ellie Kemper, voiced Peterson's wife, Patty, and Ariel Winter voiced their daughter Penny. Other voices include Stephen Tobolowsky, Allison Janney, Mel Brooks, Stanley Tucci, Patrick Warburton, Lake Bell, Zach Callison, Karan Brar, and Dennis Haysbert. According to Minkoff, Burrell was chosen because his voice "embodied all the different aspects of the character today. Not just the intellect and the suave personality, but the underlying warmth as well."

Release
Mr. Peabody & Sherman went through several release date changes. Originally scheduled for March 2014, DreamWorks Animation's high expectations moved the film to November 2013, replacing another DreamWorks Animation film, Me and My Shadow. The last shift happened in February 2013, which pushed the film back to March 7, 2014, reportedly due to a "more advantageous release window", again replacing Me and My Shadow. The film premiered a month earlier in the United Kingdom, on February 7, 2014.

The film was planned to be theatrically accompanied with a DreamWorks Animation short film, Rocky & Bullwinkle, based on the Rocky and Bullwinkle characters from The Rocky and Bullwinkle Show. The short was directed by Gary Trousdale, who is known for co-directing Disney's Beauty and the Beast, produced by Nolan Cascino, and written by Thomas Lennon and Robert Garant. June Foray was set to reprise her role as Rocket "Rocky" J. Squirrel, while Tom Kenny was set to voice Bullwinkle Moose. The short would have served as a test for a possible feature film based on the characters. Almost Home, a short based on the DreamWorks Animation film Home, played before the film instead. However, the new CGI Rocky & Bullwinkle short was instead released on the Blu-ray 3D release of the film.

Reception

Critical response
The site's critical consensus reads, "Mr. Peabody & Sherman offers a surprisingly entertaining burst of colorful all-ages fun, despite its dated source material and rather convoluted plot." Metacritic (which uses a weighted average) assigned Mr. Peabody & Sherman a score of 59 out of 100 based on 34 critics, indicating "mixed or average reviews". Audiences polled by CinemaScore gave the film an average grade of "A" on an A+ to F scale.

Peter Bradshaw of The Guardian said: "(The film) takes a little while for the audience to get up to speed, but once this is achieved, there's an awful lot of unexpected fun to be had," while Mark Kermode of the sister paper The Observer declared, "Pleasant to report, then, that DreamWorks' latest offers a fairly consistent stream of sight gags and vocal slapstick, even as the plot veers wildly down a wormhole in the time-space continuum." Kevin McFarland of The A.V. Club gave the film a C+, saying, "Unlike the whimsical, slapstick-driven shorts on which it's based, this feature-length adaptation adds an obligatory emotional arc that feels at odds with the zany spirit of historical time-travel tales." A. O. Scott of The New York Times gave the film a positive review, saying, "This DreamWorks Animation production, directed by Rob Minkoff (Stuart Little, The Lion King) from a screenplay by Craig Wright, is not perfect, but it is fast-moving, intermittently witty and pretty good fun." Richard Roeper of the Chicago Sun-Times gave the film a B, saying, "Mr. Peabody & Sherman is a whip-smart, consistently funny and good-natured film with some terrific voice performances and one of the most hilarious appearances ever by an animated version of a living human being." Claudia Puig of USA Today gave the film two and a half stars out of four, saying, "Mr. Peabody & Sherman is lively, educational and intermittently amusing. The fun, however, grows strained and formulaic as the movie goes on." Michael Phillips of the Chicago Tribune gave the film two out of four stars, saying, "The film's animation design is strictly generic in its rounded edges and dutiful 3-D IN YOUR FACE!!! gimmicks. And the story gets off to such a sour start, it takes a long time for the comedy to recover."

Bill Goodykoontz of The Arizona Republic gave the film two and a half stars out of five, saying, "It retains the main characters, the WABAC machine, the trips through history – but not the sense of nuttiness that made the TV cartoon so delightful." Colin Covert of the Star Tribune gave the film three out of four stars, saying, "What a relief to see that while Mr. Peabody'''s visuals are enhanced to sleek 21st-century standards, the essential charm of the series survives more or less intact." Elizabeth Weitzman of New York Daily News gave the film three out of four stars, saying, "Burrell doesn't quite capture the wry deadpan of the original, but then, neither does the movie. That's okay." Bruce Demara of the Toronto Star gave the film three out of four stars, saying, "Kids of all ages are sure to enjoy this visually splendid, fast-paced blast through the past." Betsy Sharkey of the Los Angeles Times gave the film a negative review, saying, "For all the ways the film reflects its earlier TV incarnation, the shadings have been softened. Mr. Peabody could use a bit more bite." Soren Anderson of The Seattle Times gave the film two and a half stars out of four, saying, "Frantically paced by director Rob Minkoff (The Lion King) and making very effective use of 3D – Hey! Get that sword out of my face! – the movie will surely appeal to kids." Rafer Guzman of Newsday gave the film two and a half stars out of four, saying, "The movie has trouble stitching together disjointed episodes into a coherent narrative. Thanks to a strong voice cast, however, the characters retain their charm throughout."

Leslie Felperin of The Hollywood Reporter gave the film a positive review, saying, "The film's saving grace is its character design and use of 3D techniques to speed things up in every sense when the plot starts to flag." Liam Lacey of The Globe and Mail gave the film two and a half stars out of four, saying, "Mr. Peabody is fast-paced and jammed with rib-poking historical references, but it couldn't be called witty, even on the broadly winking level of the original cartoon." Stephen Whitty of the Newark Star-Ledger gave the film three out of four stars, saying, "Fifty years ago, animated entertainment was a lot quieter. But that was my Mr. Peabody & Sherman. This is someone else's. And it should give them, and even a few open-minded parents, almost just as much giggly fun." Owen Gleiberman of Entertainment Weekly gave the film a B, saying, "Mr. Peabody & Sherman has a zesty time mixing and matching historical figures, from Marie Antoinette to George Washington. Yet the movie never, to my mind, conjured quite the quirky effervescence of such brainiac animated features as the Jimmy Neutron or SpongeBob SquarePants movies." Michael O'Sullivan of The Washington Post gave the film one out of four stars, saying, "By visual standards alone, the characters, rendered in eye-popping 3-D, resemble nothing so much as Macy's Thanksgiving Day Parade floats. They're just as lifeless and inexpressive, too." Sean Daly of the Tampa Bay Times gave the film a B, saying, "Before getting sucked into a what-the-wormhole ending that will scramble young brains, time-travel romp Mr. Peabody & Sherman is a fast, fun 3-D getaway."

Lou Lumenick of the New York Post gave the film three out of four stars, saying, "Against all odds, DreamWorks Animation has created a smart, funny and beautifully designed feature called Mr. Peabody & Sherman." Tom Huddleston of Time Out gave the film two out of five stars, saying, "This feature-length Mr Peabody & Sherman is by no means unbearable: there are a few decent gags, and the episodic plot just about manages to hold the interest. But there's little here for any but the most easy-to-please youngsters." Eric Henderson of Slant Magazine gave the film one and a half stars out of four, saying, "The film spent roughly a dozen years in development, and the moronic, corporate detritus from that long time warp is strewn about like so many improbable history lessons." Steven Rea of The Philadelphia Inquirer gave the film three out of four stars, saying, "Mr. Peabody & Sherman has a cool, midcentury-modern look (dog and boy live in a populuxe Manhattan penthouse) and a voice cast that may not be A-list but fits the bill nicely." David Gritten of The Daily Telegraph gave the film four out of five stars, saying, "It's sweet-natured and amusing, with a story to captivate kids; yet the script has enough witty touches to keep adults laughing too." Perry Seibert, writing for AllMovie, gave the movie two stars out of five, calling the movie "long, loud, and visually exhausting" and saying that it "feels less like an attempt to update a boomer classic for millennials than a prime example of how lazy marketing guys hold sway over what movies get made."

Box officeMr. Peabody & Sherman grossed $111.5 million in the United States and Canada, and $164.2 million in other countries, for a worldwide total of $275.7 million. With a budget of $145 million, the film underperformed, forcing DreamWorks Animation to take a $57 million write-down on behalf of the film.

In North America, the film earned $8 million on its opening day, and opened to number two in its first weekend, with $32.2 million, behind 300: Rise of an Empire. In its second weekend, the film moved up to number one, grossing $21.8 million. In its third weekend, the film dropped to number three, grossing $11.8 million. In its fourth weekend, the film dropped to number four, grossing $9.1 million.

Accolades

Soundtrack

The film's score was composed by Danny Elfman. The soundtrack was released by Relativity Music Group on March 3, 2014. Peter Andre wrote and performed for the film a song titled "Kid", which is played during the British version of the end credits, instead of Grizfolk's "Way Back When".

Home mediaMr. Peabody & Sherman was released in digital HD, Blu-ray (2D and 3D) and DVD on October 14, 2014. The Blu-ray release also included a new CGI Rocky & Bullwinkle short film. As of February 2015, 3.4 million home entertainment units were sold.

Television series

An animated television series featuring Mr. Peabody and Sherman, titled The Mr. Peabody and Sherman Show, was premiered on October 9, 2015, on Netflix. The series is based on the 1960s short film segments that aired as part of The Rocky and Bullwinkle Show'', and it also takes some elements from the film. After being revealed as time travelers at the end of the film, Mr. Peabody and Sherman launch a live TV variety show, hosting various historical figures at their Manhattan penthouse. The series is hand-drawn, with the Vancouver-based DHX Media providing the animation. Mr. Peabody is voiced by Chris Parnell, while Max Charles reprises his role as Sherman from the film. According to The Animation Guild, I.A.T.S.E. Local 839, 78 episodes of the television series have been ordered, however, only 52 episodes were made. A soundtrack for the series was released digitally on October 2, 2015, and on CD in December 2015. Published by Lakeshore Records, the album features original score and the opening theme song by Eric Goldman and Michael Corcoran (a.k.a. The Outfit), and new original songs by Jukebox the Ghost, JD McPherson, Wordsworth and Prince Paul, and Ra Ra Riot.

References

External links

 
 
 
 

2010s American animated films
2010s adventure films
2010s science fiction comedy films
2014 3D films
2014 comedy films
2014 computer-animated films
2014 films
20th Century Fox animated films
20th Century Fox films
3D animated films
Agamemnon
American 3D films
American adventure comedy films
American buddy films
American children's animated adventure films
American children's animated comic science fiction films
American children's animated science fantasy films
American computer-animated films
American fantasy comedy films
Animated buddy films
American animated feature films
Animated films about dogs
Animated films about orphans
Animated films about time travel
Animated films based on animated series
Animated films based on classical mythology
Animation based on real people
Cultural depictions of Abraham Lincoln
Cultural depictions of George Washington
Cultural depictions of Leonardo da Vinci
Cultural depictions of Sigmund Freud
DreamWorks Animation animated films
Fictional duos
Films about time travel
Films directed by Rob Minkoff
Films scored by Danny Elfman
Films set in the 12th century BC
Films set in the 14th century BC
Films set in the 1500s
Films set in the 1780s
Films set in ancient Egypt
Films set in ancient Greece
Films set in Florence
Animated films set in New York City
Films set in Texas
French Revolution films
Renaissance in popular culture
The Adventures of Rocky and Bullwinkle and Friends
Trojan War films
2010s English-language films